KF Kosova VR Prishtinë, commonly referred to as Kosova VR Prishtinë and colloquially known as Kosova VR is a football club based in Vranjevc, Pristina, Kosovo. The club plays in the Third Football League of Kosovo, which is the fourth tier of football in the country.

History
Kosova Prishtinë are two-time champions of Kosovo, both titles won during the 1950s and one-time winner of the Kosovar Cup, won during the 2003–04 season.

Honours

Players

Current squad

References

Football clubs in Kosovo
Sport in Pristina